This is a complete list of men's medalists of the European Athletics Indoor Championships.

Track

60 m

400 m

800 m

1500 m

3000 m

60 m hurdles

4 x 400 m relay

Field

High jump

Long jump

Triple jump

Pole vault

Shot put

Combined

Defunct events

200 m

4 × 2 laps relay

4×800 m relay

3 × 1000 m relay

Medlay relay

3000/5000 m walk

See also
List of European Athletics Championships medalists (men)
List of European Athletics Championships medalists (women)
List of European records in athletics

References

Result Database European Athletic Association

European Indoor
Medalists men